Mary Ahern may refer to:
 Mary Eileen Ahern (1860–1938), American librarian
 Mary V. Ahern (1922–2021), American radio and television producer